Play is a range of intrinsically motivated activities done for recreational pleasure and enjoyment. Play is commonly associated with children and juvenile-level activities, but may be engaged in at any life stage, and among other higher-functioning animals as well, most notably mammals and birds.

Many prominent researchers in the field of psychology, including Melanie Klein, Jean Piaget, William James, Sigmund Freud, Carl Jung and Lev Vygotsky have erroneously viewed play as confined to the human species, believing play was important for human development and using different research methods to prove their theories.

Play is often interpreted as frivolous; yet the player can be intently focused on their objective, particularly when play is structured and goal-oriented, as in a game. Accordingly, play can range from relaxed, free-spirited and spontaneous through frivolous to planned or even compulsive. Play is not just a pastime activity; it has the potential to serve as an important tool in numerous aspects of daily life for adolescents, adults, and cognitively advanced non-human species (such as primates). Not only does play promote and aid in physical development (such as hand-eye coordination), but it also aids in cognitive development and social skills, and can even act as a stepping stone into the world of integration, which can be a very stressful process. Play is something that most children partake in, but the way play is executed is different between cultures and the way that children engage with play varies universally.

Definitions 
The seminal text in the field of play studies is the book Homo Ludens first published in 1944 with several subsequent editions, in which Johan Huizinga defines play as follows:

This definition of play as constituting a separate and independent sphere of human activity is sometimes referred to as the "magic circle" notion of play, a phrase also attributed to Huizinga. Many other definitions exist. Jean Piaget stated, "the many theories of play expounded in the past are clear proof that the phenomenon is difficult to understand."

There are multiple aspects of play people home in on when defining it. One definition from Susanna Millar's The Psychology of Play defines play as: "any purposeful mental or physical activity performed either individually or group-wise in leisure time or at work for enjoyment, relaxation, and satisfaction of real-time or long term needs."  This definition particularly emphasizes the conditions and benefits to be gained under certain actions or activities related to play. Other definitions may focus on play as an activity that must follow certain characteristics including willingness to engage, uncertainty of the outcome, and productivity of the activity to society.

Another definition of play from the twenty-first century comes from the National Playing Fields Association (NPFA). The definition reads as follows: "play is freely chosen, personally directed, intrinsically motivated behaviour that actively engages the child." This definition focuses more on the child's freedom of choice and personal motivation related to an activity.

Forms

Play can take the form of improvisation or pretense, interactive, performance, mimicry, games, sports, and thrill-seeking, such as extreme or dangerous sports (sky-diving, high-speed racing, etc.). Philosopher Roger Caillois wrote about play in his 1961 book Man, Play and Games.

Free play gives children the freedom to decide what they want to play and how it will be played. Both the activity and the rules are subject to change in this form, and children can make any changes to the rules or objectives of the play at any time. Some countries in the twenty-first century have added emphasis of free play into their values for children in early childhood such as Taiwan and Hungary.

Structured play has clearly defined goals and rules and such play is called a "game". Other play is unstructured or open-ended. Both types of play promote adaptive behaviors and mental states of happiness.

Sports with defined rules will take place within designated play spaces, such as sports fields where, in Soccer for example, players kick a ball in a certain direction and push opponents out of their way as they do so. While appropriate within the sport's play space, these same behaviors might be inappropriate or even illegal outside the playing field.

Other designed play spaces can be playgrounds with dedicated equipment and structures to promote active and social play. Some play spaces go even farther in specialization to bring the play indoors and will often charge admission as seen at Children's Museums, Science Centers, or Family Entertainment Centers. Family Entertainment Centers (or Play Zones) are typically for-profit businesses purely for play and entertainment, while Children's Museums and Science Centers are typically non-profit organizations for educational entertainment.

The California-based National Institute for Play describes seven play patterns:
 Attunement play, which establishes a connection, such as between newborn and mother.
 Body play, in which an infant explores the ways in which his or her body works and interacts with the world, such as making funny sounds or discovering what happens in a fall.
 Object play, such as playing with toys, banging pots and pans, handling physical things in ways that use curiosity.
 Social play, play which involves others in activities such as tumbling, making faces, and building connections with another child or group of children.
 Imaginative or pretend play, in which a child invents scenarios from his or her imagination and acts within them as a form of play, such as princess or pirate play.
 Storytelling play, the play of learning and language that develops intellect, such as a parent reading aloud to a child, or a child retelling the story in his or her own words.
 Creative play, by which one plays with imagination to transcend what is known in the current state, to create a higher state. For example, a person might experiment to find a new way to use a musical instrument, thereby taking that form of music to a higher plane; or, as Einstein was known to do, a person might wonder about things which are not yet known and play with unproven ideas as a bridge to the discovery of new knowledge.

Another classification system uses categories like these:

 Replica play, such as playing with toy versions of food in a play kitchen
 Challenge play, such as solving a Rubik's Cube puzzle
 Cooperative play, such as playing on a team or making up a new game together
 Competitive play, such as a footrace
 Pretend play, such as children pretending to be animals or a storybook character
 Construction play, such as building with blocks
 Creative play, such as making up a new story or drawing a picture
 Nurturing play, such as playing with baby dolls

Some forms overlap, such as a relay race (cooperative and competitive) or building a blanket fort (construction and creative).

Separate from self-initiated play, play therapy is used as a clinical application of play aimed at treating children who suffer from trauma, emotional issues and other problems.

Children
In young children, play is frequently associated with cognitive development and socialization. Play that promotes learning and recreation often incorporates toys, props, tools or other playmates. Play can consist of an amusing, pretend or imaginary activity alone or with another. Some forms of play are rehearsals or trials for later life events, such as "play fighting", pretend social encounters (such as parties with dolls), or flirting. Modern findings in neuroscience suggest that play promotes flexibility of mind, including adaptive practices such as discovering multiple ways to achieve a desired result, or creative ways to improve or reorganize a given situation (Millar, 1967; Shonkoff & Phillips, 2000).

As children get older, they engage in board games, video games and computer play, and in this context the word gameplay is used to describe the concept and theory of play and its relationship to rules and game design. In their book, Rules of Play, researchers Katie Salen and Eric Zimmerman outline 18 schemas for games, using them to define "play", "interaction" and "design" formally for behaviorists. Similarly, in his book Half-Real: Video Games between Real Rules and Fictional Worlds, game researcher and theorist Jesper Juul explores the relationship between real rules and unreal scenarios in play, such as winning or losing a game in the real world when played together with real-world friends, but doing so by slaying a dragon in the fantasy world presented in the shared video game.

Play is explicitly recognized in Article 31 of the Convention on the Rights of the Child (adopted by the General Assembly of the United Nations, November 29, 1989), which declares:
 Parties recognize the right of the child to rest and leisure, to engage in play and recreational activities appropriate to the age of the child and to participate freely in cultural life and the arts.
 Parties shall respect and promote the right of the child to participate fully in cultural and artistic life and shall encourage the provision of appropriate and equal opportunities for cultural, artistic, recreational and leisure activities.

History of childhood playtime
American historian Howard Chudacoff has studied the interplay between parental control of toys and games and children's drive for freedom to play. In the colonial era, toys were makeshift and children taught each other very simple games with little adult supervision. The market economy of the 19th century enabled the modern concept of childhood as a distinct, happy life stage. Factory-made dolls and doll houses delighted young girls. Organized sports filtered down from adults and colleges, and boys learned to play with a bat, a ball and an impromptu playing field.

20th Century
With the rise of motor vehicle traffic in the 20th century, teenagers were increasingly organized into club sports supervised and coached by adults, with swimming taught at summer camps and through supervised playgrounds. Under the New Deal's Works Progress Administration, thousands of local playgrounds and ball fields opened, promoting softball especially as a sport for all ages and both sexes. By the 21st century, Chudacoff notes, the old tension between parental controls and a child's individual freedom was being played out in cyberspace.

Cultural differences of play 

The act of play time is a cross-cultural phenomenon that is universally accepted and encouraged by most communities; however, it can differ in the ways that is performed.

Some cultures, such as Euro-American cultural heritages, encourage play time in order to stress cognitive benefits and the importance of learning how to care for one's self. Other cultures, such as people of African American or Asian American heritages, stress more group oriented learning and play where kids can learn what they can do with and for others.
Parent interactions when it comes to playtime also differs drastically within communities. Parents in the Mayan culture do interact with their children in a playful mindset while parents in the United States tend to set aside time to play and teach their children through games and activities. In the Mayan community, children are supported in their playing but also encouraged to play while watching their parents do household work in order to become familiar with how to follow in their footsteps.

All around the world, children use different natural materials like stones, water, sand, leaves, fruits, sticks and a variety of resources to play. In addition, there are groups that have access to crafts, industrialized toys, electronics and video-games.

In Australia, games and sports are part of play. There, play can be considered as preparation for life and self- expression, like in many other countries.

Groups of children in Efe of the Democratic Republic of Congo can be seen making ‘food’ from dirt or pretending to shoot bows and arrows much like their elders. These activities are similar to other forms of play worldwide. For instance, children can be seen comforting their toy dolls or animals, anything that they have modeled from adults in their communities.

In Brazil, we can find children playing with balls, kites, marbles, pretend houses or mud kitchens, like in many other countries. In smaller communities they use mud balls, little stones or cashews to replace marbles.

At an indigenous community of Sierra Nevada de Santa Marta in Colombia, children's play is highly valued and encouraged by leaders and parents. They interact with the children of different ages and explore together different environments to let the children express themselves as part of the group.

Some children in the Sahara use clay figures as their forms of playful toys. Toys in general are a representation of cultural practices. They usually illustrate characters and objects of a community.

Play time can be used as a way for children to learn the different ways of their culture. Many communities use play to emulate work. The way in which children mimic work through their play can differ according to the opportunities they have access to, but it is something that tends to be promoted by adults.

Sports

Sportive activities are one of the most universal forms of play. Different continents have their own popular/dominant sports. For example, European, South American, and African countries enjoy soccer (also known as ‘football’ in Europe), while North American countries prefer basketball, ice hockey, baseball, or American football. In Asia, sports such as table tennis and badminton are played professionally; however soccer and basketball are played amongst common folks, with cricket popular in South Asia. Events such as The Olympic Games and FIFA World Cup showcase countries competing with each other and are broadcast all over the world.

Sports can be played as a leisure activity or within a competition. According to sociologist Norbert Elias; it is an important part of "civilization process". Victory and defeat in sports can influence one's emotions to a point where everything else seems irrelevant. Sport fans can also imagine what it feels like to play for their preferred team. The feelings people experience can be so surreal that it affects their emotions and behavior.

Benefits in youth
Youth sport can provide a positive outcome for youth development. Research shows adolescents are more motivated and engaged in sports than any other activity, and these conditions predict a richer personal and interpersonal development. Anxiety, depression and obesity can stem from lack of activity and social interaction. There is a high correlation between the amount of time that youth spend playing sports and the effects of physical (e.g., better general health), psychological (e.g., subjective well-being), academic (e.g., school grades), and social benefits (e.g., making friends). Electronics over the past 10 years have been looked as a form of playtime but researchers have found that most electronic play leads to lack of motivation, no social interaction and can lead to obesity. Play is originally based on the idea of children using their creativity while developing their imagination, dexterity, physical, cognitive and emotional strength. Dramatic play is common in younger children.  For the youth community to benefit from playtime, the following are recommended:

 Give children ample, unscheduled time to be creative to reflect and decompress
 Give children "true" toys, such as blocks or dolls for creativity
 Youth should have a group of supportive people around them (teammates, coaches, and parents) with positive relationships
 Youth should possess skill development; such as physical, interpersonal, and knowledge about the sport
 Youth should be able to make their own decisions about their sport participation
 Youth should have experiences that are on par with their certain needs and developmental level

Research findings on benefits in youth
With regular participation in a variety of sports, children can develop and become more proficient at various sports skills (including, but not limited to, jumping, kicking, running, throwing, etc.) if the focus is on skill mastery and development. Young people participating in sports also develop agility, coordination, endurance, flexibility, speed, and strength. More specifically, young athletes could develop the following

 enhanced functioning and health of cardiorespiratory and muscular systems
 improved flexibility, mobility, and coordination
 increased stamina and strength
 increased likelihood of maintaining weight

Moreover, research shows that regular participation in sport and physical activity is highly associated with lowering the risk of diabetes, heart disease, obesity, and other related diseases. According to research by the Australian Early Childhood Mental Health Initiative, children can be assisted in dealing with and managing stress by developing their sense of optimism when playing sports. Young people also tend to be more nutrition-conscious in their food choices when participating in sport Girls involved in sport tend associate with lower chance of teenage pregnancy, begin smoking, and/or developing breast cancer. Young athletes have shown lower levels of total cholesterol and other favorable profiles in serum lipid parameters associated with cardiovascular disease. Sport provides an arena for young people to be physically active and in result reduce the time spent in sedentary pursuits, such as watching TV and playing video games.

Adults

Although adults who engage in high amounts of play may find themselves described as "childish" or "young at heart" by less playful adults, play is an important activity, regardless of age. Creativity and happiness can result from adult play, where the objective can be more than fun alone, as in adult expression of the arts, or curiosity-driven science. Some adult "hobbies" are examples of such creative play. In creative professions, such as design, playfulness can remove more serious attitudes (such as shame or embarrassment) that impede brainstorming or artistic experimentation in design.

Imaginative play and role play may allow adult individuals to practice useful habits such as learned optimism, which is helpful in managing fear or terrors. Play also offers adults the opportunity to practice concepts that may not have been explicitly or formally taught (e.g. how to manage misinformation or deceit). Thus, even though play is just one of many tools used by effective adults, it remains a necessary one.

Workplace
There has been extensive research when it comes to the benefits of play amongst children, youth, and adolescence. Most commonly overlooked are the benefits of play for adults, more specifically, adults who spend a lot of time in the workplace. Many adults in North America are in the workforce and spend half of their waking hours in a workplace environment with little to no time for play. Play in this context refers to leisure-type activities with colleagues during lunch breaks or short breaks throughout the working day. Leisure activities could include, but are not limited to, different forms of physical sport activities, card games, board games, video games and interaction-based type video games, foosball, ping-pong, yoga, and boot-camp sessions.

Research shows that playing games may promote a persistent and optimistic motivational style and positive affect. Positive affect enhances people's experiences, enjoyment, and sense of satisfaction derived from the activity, during their engagement with a certain task. While people are engaged in their work, positive affect increases the satisfaction they feel from the work, and this has also been shown to increase their creativity and improve their performance on problem-solving tasks as well as other tasks. The development of a persistent motivational style charged with positive affect may lead to lasting work success.

Studies show that work and play are mutually supportive. Employees need to experience the sense of newness, flow, discovery and liveliness that play provides. By doing this, it will provide the employee with the sense that they are integrated within the organization, and therefore they will feel and perform better.

By incorporating play at work, it will also result in more productivity, creativity and innovation, higher job satisfaction, greater workplace morale, stronger or new social bonds, improved job performance, a decrease in staff turnover, absenteeism and stress. Decreased stress leads to less illness, which results in lower health care costs. Play at work may help employees function and cope when under stress, refresh body and mind, encourage teamwork, trigger creativity, and increase energy while preventing burnout.

Studies show that companies that encourage play at work, whether short breaks throughout the day or during lunch breaks experience more success because it leads to positive emotion amongst employees. Risk taking, confidence in presenting novel ideas, and embracing unusual and fresh perspectives are common characteristics associated with play at work. Play can increase self-reported job satisfaction and well-being. Employees experiencing positive emotions are more cooperative, more social, and perform better when faced with complex tasks.

Contests, team-building exercises, fitness programs, mental health breaks and other social activities, will make the work environment fun, interactive, and rewarding. Also playfighting, i.e. playful fights or fictive disputes, may contribute to organizations and institutions, as in youth care settings. Staff tries to down-key playfight invitations to "treatment" or "learning," but playfighting also offers youth and staff identificatory respite from the institutional regime. Wästerfors (2016) has found that playfighting is a recurrent pattern in the social life of a youth care institution and sits at the core of what inmates and staff have to deal with

Seniors 
Older adults represent one of the fastest growing populations around the world. In fact, the United Nations predicted an increase of those aged 60 and above from 629 million in 2002 to approximately two billion in 2050 but increased life expectancy does not necessarily translate to a better quality of life. For this reason, research has begun to investigate methods to maintain and/or improve quality of life among older adults.

Similar to the data surrounding children and adults, play and activity are associated with improved health and quality of life among seniors. Additionally, play and activity tend to affect successful aging as well as boost well-being throughout the lifespan. Although children, adults, and seniors all tend to benefit from play, older adults often perform it in unique ways to account for possible issues, such as health restrictions, limited accessibility, and revised priorities. For this reason, elderly people may partake in physical exercise groups, interactive video games, and social forums specifically geared towards their needs and interests. One qualitative research study found older adults often chose to engage in specific games such as dominoes, checkers, and bingo for entertainment. Another study indicated a common pattern within game preferences among older adults; seniors often favor activities that encourage mental and physical fitness, incorporate past interests, have some level of competition, and foster a sense of belonging. Researchers investigating play in older adults are also interested in the benefits of technology and video games as therapeutic tools. Studies show these outlets can lower the risk of developing particular diseases, reduce feelings of social isolation and stress, as well as promote creativity and the maintenance of cognitive skills. As a result, play has been integrated into physiotherapy and occupational therapy interventions for seniors.

The ability to incorporate play into one's routine is important because these activities allow participants to express creativity, improve verbal and non-verbal intelligence as well as enhance balance. These benefits may be especially crucial to seniors because evidence shows cognitive and physical functioning declines with age. However, other research argues it might not be aging that is associated with the decline in cognitive and physical capabilities. More specifically, some studies indicate it could be the higher levels of inactivity within older adults that may have significant ramifications on their health and well-being.

With attention to these hypotheses, research shows play and activity tend to decline with age which may result in negative outcomes such as social isolation, depression, and mobility issues. American studies found that only 24% of seniors took part in regular physical activity and only 42% use the internet for entertainment purposes. In comparison to other age groups, the elderly are more likely to experience a variety of barriers, such as difficulty with environmental hazards and accessibility related issues, that may hinder their abilities to execute healthy play behaviours. Similarly, although playing may benefit seniors, it also has the potential to negatively impact their health. For example, those who play may be more susceptible to injury. Investigating these barriers may assist in the creation of useful interventions and/or the development of preventative measures, such as establishing safer recreational areas, that promote the maintenance of play behaviours throughout elderly life.

A significant amount of literature suggests a moderate level of play has numerous positive outcomes in the lives of senior citizens. In order to support and promote play within the older population, studies suggest institutions should set up more diverse equipment, improve conditions within recreational areas, and create more video games or online forums that appeal to the needs of seniors.

Other animals
Evolutionary psychologists believe that there must be an important benefit of play, as there are so many reasons to avoid it. Many animals are often injured during play, become distracted from predators, and expend valuable energy. In rare cases, play has even been observed between different species that are natural enemies such as a polar bear and a dog. Yet play seems to be a normal activity with animals who occupy the higher strata of their own hierarchy of needs. Animals on the lower strata, e.g. stressed and starving animals, generally do not play. However, in wild Assamese macaques physically active play is performed also during periods of low food availability and even if it is at the expense of growth, which strongly highlights the developmental and evolutionary importance of play.

The social cognitive complexity of numerous species, including dogs, have recently been explored in experimental studies. In one such study, conducted by Alexandra Horowitz of the University of California, the communication and attention-getting skills of dogs were investigated. In a natural setting, dyadic play behavior was observed; head-direction and posture was specifically noted. When one of the two dogs was facing away or otherwise preoccupied, attention-getting behaviors and signals (nudging, barking, growling, pawing, jumping, etc.) were used by the other dog to communicate the intent and/or desire to continue on with the dyadic play. Stronger or more frequent signaling was used if the attention of the other dog was not captured. These observations tell us that these dogs know how play behavior and signaling can be used to capture attention, communicate intent and desire, and manipulate one another. This characteristic and skill, called the "attention-getting skill" has generally only been seen in humans, but is now being researched and seen in many different species.

Observing play behavior in various species can tell much about the player's environment (including the welfare of the animal), personal needs, social rank (if any), immediate relationships, and eligibility for mating. Play activity, often observed through action and signals, often serves as a tool for communication and expression. Through mimicry, chasing, biting, and touching, animals will often act out in ways so as to send messages to one another; whether it's an alert, initiation of play, or expressing intent. When play behavior was observed for a study in Tonkean macaques, it was discovered that play signals weren't always used to initiate play; rather, these signals were viewed primarily as methods of communication (sharing information and attention-getting). 

One theory – "play as preparation" – was inspired by the observation that play often mimics adult themes of survival. Predators such as lions and bears play by chasing, pouncing, pawing, wrestling, and biting, as they learn to stalk and kill prey. Prey animals such as deer and zebras play by running and leaping as they acquire speed and agility. Hoofed mammals also practice kicking their hind legs to learn to ward off attacks. Indeed, time spent in physical play accelerates motor skill acquisition in wild Assamese macaques. While mimicking adult behavior, attacking actions such as kicking and biting are not completely fulfilled, so playmates do not generally injure each other. In social animals, playing might also help to establish dominance rankings among the young to avoid conflicts as adults.

John Byers, a zoologist at the University of Idaho, discovered that the amount of time spent at play for many mammals (e.g. rats and cats) peaks around puberty, and then drops off. This corresponds to the development of the cerebellum, suggesting that play is not so much about practicing exact behaviors, as much as building general connections in the brain. Sergio Pellis and colleagues at the University of Lethbridge in Alberta, Canada, discovered that play may shape the brain in other ways, too. Young mammals have an overabundance of brain cells in their cerebrum (the outer areas of the brain – part of what distinguishes mammals). There is evidence that play helps the brain clean up this excess of cells, resulting in a more efficient cerebrum at maturity.

Marc Bekoff (a University of Colorado evolutionary biologist) proposes a "flexibility" hypothesis that attempts to incorporate these newer neurological findings. It argues that play helps animals learn to switch and improvise all behaviors more effectively, to be prepared for the unexpected. There may, however, be other ways to acquire even these benefits of play: the concept of equifinality. The idea is that the social benefits of play for many animals, for example, could instead be garnered by grooming. Patrick Bateson maintains that equifinality is exactly what play teaches. In accordance with the flexibility hypothesis, play may teach animals to avoid "false endpoints". In other words, they will harness the childlike tendency to keep playing with something that works "well enough", eventually allowing them to come up with something that might work better, if only in some situations. This also allows mammals to build up various skills that could come in handy in entirely novel situations. A study on two species of monkeys Semnopithecus entellus and Macaca mulatta that came into association with each other during food provisioning by pilgrims at the Ambagarh Forest Reserve, near Jaipur, India, shows the interspecific interaction that developed between the juveniles of the two species when opportunity presented itself.

Development and learning 

Learning through play has been long recognized as a critical aspect of childhood and child development. Some of the earliest studies of play started in the 1890s with G. Stanley Hall, the father of the child study movement that sparked an interest in the developmental, mental and behavioral world of babies and children. Play also promotes healthy development of parent-child bonds, establishing social, emotional and cognitive developmental milestones that help them relate to others, manage stress, and learn resiliency.

Modern research in the field of affective neuroscience (the neural mechanisms of emotion) has uncovered important links between role play and neurogenesis in the brain. For example, researcher Roger Caillois used the word ilinx to describe the momentary disruption of perception that comes from forms of physical play that disorient the senses, especially balance.

Studies have found that play and coping to daily stressors to be positively correlated in children. By playing, children regulate their emotions and this is important for adaptive functioning because without regulation, emotions could be overwhelming and stressful.

Evolutionary psychologists have begun to explore the phylogenetic relationship between higher intelligence in humans and its relationship to play, i.e., the relationship of play to the progress of whole evolutionary groups as opposed to the psychological implications of play to a specific individual.

Physical, mental and social 
Various forms of play, whether it is physical or mental, have influenced cognitive abilities in individuals. As little as ten minutes of exercise (including physical play), can improve cognitive abilities. These researchers did a study and have developed an "exergame" which is a game that incorporates some physical movement but is by no means formal exercise. These games increase one's heart rate to the level of aerobics exercise and have proven to result in recognizable improvements in mental faculties
In this study they use play in a way that incorporates physical activity that creates physical excursions. The results of the study had statistical significance. There were improvements in math by 3.4% and general improvements in recall memory by 4% among the participants of the study.

On the other hand, other research has focused on the cognitive effects of mentally stimulating play. Good toys for young children need to match their stages of development and emerging abilities. Younger children can benefit from simply learning about their geometric shapes, while older children can build various original constructions. Playing video games is one of the most common mediums of play for children and adults today. There have been mixed reviews on the effects of video games. Despite this, according to a research conducted by Hollis (2014),
"[playing video games] was positively associated with skills strongly related to academic success, such as time management, attention, executive control, memory, and spatial abilities – when playing video game occurs in moderation".

Play can also influence one's social development and social interactions. Much of the research focuses on the influence play has on child social development. There are different forms of play that have been noted to influence child social development. One study conducted by (Sullivan, 2003) explores the influence of playing styles with mothers versus playing styles with fathers and how it influences child social development. This article explains that "integral to positive development is the child's social competence or, more precisely, the ability to regulate their own emotions and behaviors in the social contexts of early childhood to support the effective accomplishment of relevant developmental tasks.

Social benefits of play have been measured using basic interpersonal values such as getting along with peers. One of the social benefits that this researcher has uncovered is that play with parents has proven to reduce anxiety in children. Having play time with parents that involves socially acceptable behaviour makes it easier for children to relate to be more socially adjusted to peers at school or at play Social development involving child interaction with peers is thus an area of influence for playful interactions with parents and peers.

Play in educational practices

Anji play 
Anji play (安吉游戏 in simplified Chinese, 安吉遊戲 in traditional Chinese) is an educational method based on children's self-directed play in outside spaces, using simple tools made of natural material. The teachers and instructors only observe and document the children's independent play. The method was created by Cheng Xueqin and is organized in two hours of free play when the children choose the available material they want to use and build structures to play.

While planning, experimenting, building and using the structures to play, the children have the opportunity to interact with peers, to think critically about what may work, to discuss the plan and organize the construction hard work. The process is observed and recorded by the teachers and instructors without intervention, even in instances of possible risk.

Before and after the two hours of play, the children have the opportunity to express their plans and discuss with their peers. After the play, they get the opportunity to draw, write or explain what they did. Then, they watch the videos recorded the same day and explain how they played and comment on each other's creations.

Anji play is also called "true play" and its guiding principles are love, risk, joy, engagement, and reflection. This method of self-initiated and self-directed play is applied at the pre-schools (to children from 3 to 6 years-old) in Anji county, East China.

References

Further reading
 Caillois, R. (2001). Man, play, and games. Urbana and Chicago, University of Illinois Press (originally published in 1958; translated from the French by Meyer Barash).
 Encyclopedia: Play Science Scholarpedia
 Huizinga, J. (1955). Homo ludens; a study of the play-element in culture. Boston: Beacon Press.
 Jenkinson, Sally (2001). The Genius of Play. Hawthorn Press
 Sutton-Smith, B. (1997). The ambiguity of play. Cambridge: Harvard University Press.
 Burghardt, Gordon M. The Genesis of Animal Play: Testing the Limits 
 Wenner, M. (2009). "The Serious Need for Play" – Free, imaginative play is crucial for normal social, emotional and cognitive development. It makes us better adjusted, smarter and less stressed, Scientific American.
 
 Gray, P. (2013). Free to Learn: Why Unleashing the Instinct to Play Will Make Our Children Happier, More Self-Reliant, and Better Students for Life
 Gray, P. (2008–2009). "Social Play and the Genesis of Democracy", "The Value of Play I: The Definition of Play Provides Clues to Its Purposes", "The Value of Play II: How Play Promotes Reasoning in Children and Adults", "The Value of Play III: Children Use Play to Confront, not Avoid, Life's Challenges and Even Life's Horrors", "The Value of Play IV: Play is Nature's Way of Teaching Us New Skills", "How to Ruin Children's Play: Supervise, Praise, Intervene", Psychology Today.
 Howard Taras, (2009). Journal of School Health. Physical Activity and School Performance. 75 (6), pp. 214–218
 Kortmulder, Koenraad (1998). Play and Evolution: Second Thoughts on the Behaviour of Animals, 
 Piaget, J. (1962). Play, dreams and imitation (Vol. 24). New York: Norton
 Bateson, Gregory. (1955). A theory of play and fantasy. Psychiatric research reports,2(39), 39–51. Reprinted in Steps to an Ecology of Mind, 1972. Chandler, and 2000, University of Chicago Press.
 Stebbins, Robert A. (2015). The Interrelationship of Leisure and Play: Play as Leisure, Leisure as Play. Houndmills, UK: Palgrave Macmillan.
 
 Massimo Colella, Rinascimento ludens: Girolamo Bargagli e i «giuochi» delle veglie senesi, in «La parola del testo», XXVII, 1-2, 2023, pp. 87-118.

External links

 The National Institute for Play
 The Play Foundation
 IPA World Home (International Play Association: Promoting the Child's Right to Play)
 Creative Play
 Brown, Stuart (2008) Why play is vital – no matter your age, TEDtalks, TED.com

 
Behavior
Ethology
Learning
Childhood